Vermilynx is a genus of wormlion in the family Vermileonidae.

Species
Vermilynx jasoni Stuckenberg, 1996
Vermilynx vansoni (Stuckenberg, 1965)

References

Diptera of Africa
Brachycera genera
Taxa named by Brian Roy Stuckenberg
Vermileonomorpha